Vathana Keodouangdeth (born 28 January 1996) is a former Laotian footballer who played as a goalkeeper for the Laotian national team and Lao Toyota.

In the absence of senior goalkeepers, Keodouangdeth played in all three of Laos' games at the 2014 AFC Challenge Cup.

In 2017, Keodouangdeth was banned for life from all football-related activities as a result of match fixing, along with 21 other players of Lao Toyota and the national team.

References 

Living people
1996 births
Laotian footballers
Laos international footballers
Association football goalkeepers
Footballers at the 2014 Asian Games
Sportspeople banned for life
Sportspeople involved in betting scandals
Asian Games competitors for Laos